Ian Fleming, the writer who created the fictional character James Bond, lived to see the success of his novels depicted on screen before he died. All fourteen books in the series created by Fleming went on to be huge successes on screen. Goldfinger, one of the most epic stories in the James Bond saga, became a fan favourite with Shirley Bassey singing the iconic song, "Goldfinger", that was played for the fiftieth anniversary of the Bond series at the Oscars in 2012. Bond was played by Sean Connery and George Lazenby in the films shot throughout the 1960s. The Bond movies were filmed all across the world and by different directors each time, with some of the old directors collaborating with the new ones. The success of each Bond film lead to bigger budget prices for the following films adapted to the big screen. Each film recovered its budget and won critically acclaimed awards the years that they came out. Of all the Bond films in cinema today, Thunderball is the most successful with the whole Bond series being the third highest grossing of all time in Hollywood cinema.

Dr. No

From Russia with Love

Goldfinger

Thunderball

You Only Live Twice

On Her Majesty's Secret Service

Critical response

References

Bibliography
 
 
 
 
 
 
 
 
 

James Bond in film
1960s in film
Bond